Porn Time is an online streaming application formed from Popcorn Time, for the purpose of viewing pornographic content.

It was released on June 6, 2015 and has since acquired a large user base.

The desktop app was downloaded by 450,000 users in the first week after it launched, overloading the download servers. Torrentfreak quoted the development team saying: “We’re pretty shocked and find it a little hard to believe and amusing in a way. But Porn Time, the Popcorn Time for Porn, became an Internet phenomenon just one week after it went live!”

The country which has the most downloads of Porn Time is the US, followed by France and Brazil. Porn Time was initially released for Windows, Mac and Linux, and is also available for Android devices. According to the team leader, Porn Time was created due to the demand for porn in Popcorn Time.

See also
 Popcorn Time

References

External links

 

2015 software
Free BitTorrent clients
Free media players
Peer-to-peer
Streaming media systems
Streaming software
Video on demand services